The Sustainability Network  (REDE) is an environmentalist Brazilian political party founded in 2013 by Marina Silva, a Brazilian politician from Acre. The party formed a strategic alliance with the Brazilian Socialist Party for the 2014 Brazilian general election, until its registration as an independent political party was approved in 2015. The Sustainability Network has 19,090 members as of January 2017.

For the Brazilian general election of 2018 REDE formed with the Green Party the coalition United to transform Brazil, in support of Marina Silva. In the 2022 Brazilian general election REDE formed a coalition with other leftist parties for the pre-candidacy of Luiz Inácio Lula da Silva with the coalition Let's go together for Brazil.

Electoral history

Presidential elections

Legislative elections

References 

2013 establishments in Brazil
Political parties established in 2013
Social democratic parties in Brazil
Anti-corruption parties
Centre-left parties in South America
Environmental organisations based in Brazil
Environmentalism in Brazil
Centrist parties in Brazil
Sustainability in Brazil
Sustainability organizations